The 1905–06 season was Madrid Football Club's 4th season in existence. The club played three friendly matches including their first international match against French club Gallia FC. They also played in the Campeonato de Madrid (Madrid Championship) and the Copa del Rey. Madrid FC won both competitions becoming the first club to successfully defend both titles.

Summary
 23 October: Madrid organised a friendly game against French side Gallia FC to commemorate the visit of French President Émile Loubet to Madrid. The match ended with a 1–1 draw. It was the first international match to take place in Madrid.

Friendlies

Competitions

Overview

Campeonato de Madrid

Copa del Rey

Notes

References

External links
Realmadrid.com Official Site
International Friendlies of Real Madrid CF - Overview
1905-06 (Campeonato de Madrid)

Real Madrid
Real Madrid CF seasons